Liang Bin (born April 1956) is a former Chinese politician from Shanxi province. He spent most of his career working in his home province, successively serving as the Party Secretary of the cities of Shuozhou and Xinzhou, before being transferred to Hebei province in June 2008 to head the party's provincial Organization Department. Liang was investigated by the Chinese Communist Party's anti-graft agency in November 2014.

Biography
Liang was born and raised in Xiaoyi, Shanxi, a county situated near the city of Lüliang. He began his political career in August 1974, and joined the Chinese Communist Party in June 1979. During the Cultural Revolution, he became a sent-down youth worked in his home province.
He entered Taiyuan University of Technology in December 1976, majoring in electrical machinery, where he graduated in August 1979.
He spent 13 years working at his alma mater before serving in various political roles in Shanxi province.

In December 1992 he became the Deputy Secretary of Communist Youth League of Shanxi Provincial Party Committee, rising to Secretary (i.e. leader) in 1994. In July 1996, he served as Executive Deputy Party Secretary of Xinzhou, and acceded to the post of party chief in 1998.

In October 2001, he was appointed the party chief of Shuozhou, he remained in that position until January 2003, when he was transferred to Taiyuan, capital of Shanxi province, and appointed the Vice-Governor of Shanxi province, he was re-elected in October 2006. In May 2008, he was transferred to Hebei province and became a member of the Hebei provincial Party Standing Committee.

In June 2008, he served as the head of Organization Department of the Hebei Provincial Committee of the Communist Party. At the 18th Party Congress in November 2012, Liang earned a seat on the 18th Central Commission for Discipline Inspection (CCDI), the Communist party's top anti-graft body. Liang took part in the widely publicized democratic life meetings of the Hebei provincial Standing Committee attended by Xi Jinping. On November 20, 2014, he was being investigated by the same Commission for "serious violations of laws and regulations".

Liang was the second CCDI member to be investigated by the commission itself following the 18th Party Congress; the first was Shen Weichen, who was also from Shanxi province. Liang's CCDI membership was revoked in January 2015 after a confirmation vote at the Fifth Plenary Session of the 18th CCDI. It is widely believed that Liang's investigation is related to his term in office in Shanxi province.

On January 26, 2015, the CCDI announced that Liang would be expelled from the Chinese Communist Party after an investigation. He was said to have abused his power to seek gain for others, taken massive bribes personally and through his family, and "committed adultery." Liang was sentenced to 8 years in prison on November 25, 2016.

References

|-

|-

|-

1968 births
Chinese Communist Party politicians from Shanxi
Living people
Political office-holders in Shanxi
People's Republic of China politicians from Shanxi
Politicians from Lüliang
Taiyuan University of Technology alumni
Vice-governors of Shanxi
Expelled members of the Chinese Communist Party
Chinese politicians convicted of corruption